Alinea is a restaurant in Chicago, Illinois, United States. In 2010, Alinea was awarded three stars by the Michelin Guide. Since the  closing on December 20, 2017 of Grace, Alinea remains  the only Chicago restaurant with  three  Michelin stars.

History 
The restaurant opened on May 4, 2005, and takes its name from the symbol alinea, which is featured as a logo.

Co-owner Nick Kokonas wrote of the restaurant's name,  Alinea literally means "off the line." The restaurant's symbol, more commonly known as the pilcrow, indicates the beginning of a new train of thought, or a new paragraph. There's a double meaning: on one hand, Alinea claims to represent a new train of thought about food, but as a restaurant, everything still has to come "off the line."

In October 2008, chef and owner Grant Achatz and co-author Kokonas published Alinea, a hardcover coffee-table book featuring more than 100 of the restaurant's recipes.

In January 2016, the Alinea Group, the owner of Alinea, bought Moto restaurant in Chicago.

On January 1, 2016, Alinea closed temporarily for renovations. The restaurant planned to operate pop-up restaurants worldwide before reopening on May 20, 2016 after an extensive remodel and overhaul of the menu.

In May 2016, Alinea and its chef and owner Grant Achatz were featured in the Netflix show Chef's Table. The innovative food of Alinea and the journey of Achatz to renowned chef were highlighted

Awards and honors
Alinea received the AAA Five Diamond Award, the highest level of recognition given by the AAA, from 2007 to 2017. It  ranked ninth  on the S. Pellegrino World's 50 Best Restaurants List, second only to Eleven Madison Park in the US. As of 2017, Alinea is the only Michelin Guide 3-star restaurant in Chicago. Alinea received the 2016 James Beard Foundation Award for Outstanding Restaurant.

In 2016, Alinea was ranked 15th among the World's 50 Best Restaurants, an increase of 11 spots from 2015. In October 2016, TripAdvisor named it the number one fine dining restaurant in the United States, and one of the 10 best restaurants in the world.

In the 2017 list of the World's 50 Best Restaurants, Alinea was ranked 21st in the world.
In the 2018 list of the World's 50 Best Restaurants, Alinea was ranked 34th in the world.
In the 2019 list, Alinea was ranked 37th in the world.

Controversy
In 2020, Alinea served diners from a rooftop when all indoor dining was closed in Illinois during the coronavirus pandemic.  The menu included a canapé shaped like the SARS‑CoV‑2 virus. Alinea Group co-owner Nick Kokonas stated the appetizer was "meant to provoke discomfort, conversation, and awareness"  but some diners described it as "tacky," "disrespectful," and "insensitive."

See also
 List of Michelin three starred restaurants
 List of Michelin 3-star restaurants in the United States
 Next (restaurant)
 The Aviary (bar)

References

External links

 
 youtube.com 24 Hours at Alinea
 Spinning Plates, 2012 documentary features three unique restaurants and their respective owners including those of Alinea

Restaurants in Chicago
Michelin Guide starred restaurants in Illinois
Molecular gastronomy
Restaurants established in 2005
James Beard Foundation Award winners
Fine dining
2005 establishments in the United States